"Duckworth" (stylized as "DUCKWORTH.") is a song by American rapper Kendrick Lamar, taken from his fourth studio album Damn, released on April 14, 2017. The fourteenth and final track on the album (first on the Collector's Edition of Damn), the lyrics were written by Lamar while the music was written by record producer Patrick Douthit, known professionally as 9th Wonder, with additional production by Bēkon 

The song's title is Lamar's actual last name, Lamar being his middle name. The song tells the true story of Lamar's father meeting Anthony "Top Dawg" Tiffith, years prior to Lamar getting signed to his record label.

Lyrics 
The song uses storytelling to tell the connection of Lamar with his father, Kenny "Ducky" Duckworth, and his TDE label-boss, Anthony "Top Dawg" Tiffith. Specifically, the song tells the story about Top Dawg's previous encounters with Ducky, many years prior to Top Dawg signing Lamar to his label.

More specifically, it tells the story of how Top Dawg and Ducky were gangbangers. When he was younger, Top Dawg frequented the KFC where Ducky worked; this is the same KFC that Top Dawg had stuck up a few years prior, where he killed a manager, and maybe even a few customers. Ducky found out about this and made sure he stood on Top Dawg's good side: giving him free chicken, extra biscuits, etc. When Top Dawg did eventually hold up the restaurant again, he and his cohorts made sure not to kill Ducky. If it weren't for these events and circumstances, Kendrick Lamar states he would have died in a gunfight without the positive influence of his father.

The song, like "Fear", another track from Damn, incorporates "backwards vocals", also known as backmasking.

Critical reception 
Teddy Craven of The Daily Campus described "Duckworth" as Damn's "strongest song" and "ends the album with a fantastic philosophical mic-drop." Craven compared the track to "Sing About Me, I'm Dying of Thirst" from Lamar's second studio album Good Kid, M.A.A.D City, a song that also tells personal stories about the unexpected consequences of Lamar's music.

The song attracted attention of media in the former Yugoslavia due to its sample of "Ostavi trag" ("Leave a Mark") by Yugoslav jazz-rock band September.

Samples 
The song contains samples of "Atari" by Hiatus Kaiyote, "Ostavi trag" by September, "Let the Drums Speak" by Fatback Band, and "Be Ever Wonderful" by Ted Taylor. 9th Wonder sampled "Mole on the Dole" by Climax Blues Band for the track's drums.

Credits and personnel 
Credits adapted from the official Damn digital booklet.
Kendrick Duckworth – songwriter
Patrick Douthit – songwriter, producer, mixing
Bēkon – additional production, additional vocals
Kid Capri – additional vocals
Derek Ali – mixing
Tyler Page – mixing, mix assistant
Cyrus Taghipour – mix assistant
Zeke Mishanec  – additional recording
Brendan Silas Perry – additional recording

Charts

Certifications

References

2017 songs
Kendrick Lamar songs
Songs written by Kendrick Lamar
Songs written by 9th Wonder